Mosese "Moses" Suli (born 9 June 1998) is a Tonga international rugby league player who plays as a  and er for the St. George Illawarra Dragons  in the NRL. 

Suli previously played for the Wests Tigers, was signed by the Canterbury-Bankstown Bulldogs before his contract was terminated ahead of the 2018 NRL season for repeated indiscretions during pre-season, he then joined Manly Warringah Sea Eagles.

Background
Suli was born in Geelong Crescent in St John's Park Fairfield, New South Wales, Australia. He is of Tongan descent.

He played his junior rugby league for Fairfield United. He was then signed by the Wests Tigers. Suli later said, "I got axed by Parra in Harold Matthews when I was 16. They actually wanted me back but I just didn’t want to go back. I just said I wasn’t interested. I was going good at the Tigers and I just wanted to stay here."

Playing career

2016
In 2016, Suli played for the Wests Tigers' NYC team.

2017
In January, Suli re-signed with the Tigers on a 3-year contract until the end of 2020. 

In round 1 of the 2017 NRL season, he made his NRL debut for the Tigers against the South Sydney Rabbitohs, scoring a try. The Daily Telegraph said, "Apart from owning wonderful speed, footwork and vision, Suli is also larger than your favourite reality TV star’s ego. Truly, this young bloke is the real deal. A genuine Next Big Thing."

2018
On January 31, Suli was released by the Wests Tigers. It was reported that Suli would only attend training sessions for five minutes, and would sleep in a teammates car while the team was training. 

He was quickly signed by the Canterbury-Bankstown Bulldogs. However, 28 days later, his new contract was terminated by the Belmore-based club following repeated indiscretions. It was revealed he had been given 2 warnings in his first 2 weeks at the club.

Suli subsequently joined Manly-Warringah, making his debut in round 9. By round 14, he had been dropped again after misplacing his passport and missing training in New Zealand.

2019
On 2 April, Suli was dropped from the Manly side for the club's Round 4 match against South Sydney for failing to meet the club's disciplinary standards.

Suli made a total of 22 appearances for Manly and scored 6 tries as the club finished 6th on the table and qualified for the finals.  Suli played in both finals games for the club and scored a try in each match as they were eliminated in the semi-final by South Sydney at ANZ Stadium.

2020
In round 16, Suli was taken from the field during Manly's 56-16 loss against South Sydney. He was later ruled out for the rest of the season with injury. He made a total of 13 appearances for Manly scoring two tries.

2021
In round 22, Suli came on as 18th man in Manly's 56-10 victory over Parramatta and scored two tries.

Suli played a total of 13 games for Manly in 2021, including the club's preliminary final loss against South Sydney.  On 6 October, he was released early from his contract to join St. George Illawarra.

2022
Suli made his club debut for St. George Illawarra in round 1 of the 2022 NRL season against the New Zealand Warriors.  On 19 July, it was confirmed that Suli had suffered a leg injury and would be told that he would return during the NRL Finals.

Suli played 17 games for the club throughout 2022 as they finished 10th on the table and missed the finals for a fourth straight season.

In October he was named in the Tonga squad for the 2021 Rugby League World Cup.

References

External links

Manly Sea Eagles profile
Wests Tigers profile
NRL profile

1998 births
Australian rugby league players
Australian sportspeople of Tongan descent
Tonga national rugby league team players
Wests Tigers players
Manly Warringah Sea Eagles players
St. George Illawarra Dragons players
Wests Tigers NSW Cup players
Rugby league centres
Rugby league wingers
Living people
Rugby league players from Sydney